Sunrise Hospital & Medical Center is a for-profit hospital owned by the Hospital Corporation of America and operated by Sunrise Healthcare System. It is located in the Las Vegas Valley in Winchester, Nevada.

History
Sunrise was founded in 1958. It was designed by architect Hugh E. Taylor and built by Las Vegas developer Irwin Molasky alongside businessmen Moe Dalitz, Allard Roen and Merv Adelson. The hospital established the area's first neonatal ICU in 1974.

Sunrise received 199 wounded patients in the aftermath of the 2017 Las Vegas shooting.

Services
 Level II Trauma center
 Member of the National Organ Transplant Network.
 Neonatal intensive care unit

Accreditation
 Joint Commission accredited
 Inpatient rehabilitation facility accredited by the Commission on Accreditation of Rehabilitation Facilities
 Breast Center fully accredited by the National Accreditation Program for Breast Centers

References

External links
 

1958 establishments in Nevada
Buildings and structures in Winchester, Nevada
Children's hospitals in the United States
Hospital buildings completed in 1958
HCA Healthcare
Hospitals established in 1958
Hospitals in the Las Vegas Valley
Teaching hospitals in Nevada